Arratia-Nerbioi (Spanish: Arratia-Nervión) is a comarca of the province of Biscay, in the Basque Country, Spain. It is formed by the valleys of the Arratia river and the Nervión river. It is one of the seven eskualdeak or comarcas that compose the province of Biscay.

Geography 

Arratia-Nerbioi is located on the south of the province of Biscay. It limits with the region of Greater Bilbao on the north and Durangaldea on the northeast. The Basque province of Álava is on the south. The comarca of Arratia-Nerbioi is formed by the valleys of the Arratia river and the Nervión river.

Municipalities 

Comarcas of Biscay